Bogdana Valeriyevna Lukashevich (born 6 July 1996) is a Russian-born pair skater who competes for Belarus. With her skating partner, Alexander Stepanov, she is the 2020 Ice Star champion, the 2020 Winter Star champion, and the 2021 Belarusian national champion. They competed in the final segment at the 2021 World Championships.

Lukashevich/Stepanov represented Russia until switching to Belarus in June 2020.

Programs 
 With Stepanov

Competitive highlights 
CS: Challenger Series

With Stepanov 
 For Belarus

 For Russia

Ladies' singles for Russia

Detailed results 
ISU Personal Best highlighted in bold.

 With Stepanov

For Belarus

For Russia

References

External links 
 

1996 births
Living people
Russian female pair skaters
Belarusian female pair skaters
Russian emigrants to Belarus
People from Naberezhnye Chelny
Sportspeople from Tatarstan